This is a list of notable people born in, or associated with, Newcastle upon Tyne in England.

Born in Newcastle

Residents (past and present)

References

Newcastle upon Tyne

People